Hyalosepalum is a genus of flowering plants belonging to the family Menispermaceae.

Its native range is Tropical and Southern Africa, Madagascar.

Species:

Hyalosepalum caffrum 
Hyalosepalum mossambicense 
Hyalosepalum oblongifolium 
Hyalosepalum penninervifolium 
Hyalosepalum scytophyllum

References

Menispermaceae
Menispermaceae genera